Meadow Bluff is an unincorporated community in Greenbrier County, West Virginia, United States.

The community was named after the meadows and bluffs near the original town site. Located near Meadow Bluff is the Deitz Farm, listed on the National Register of Historic Places in 1992.

References

Unincorporated communities in Greenbrier County, West Virginia
Unincorporated communities in West Virginia